Anegpur is a village of Sant Ravidas Nagar district, in the state of Uttar Pradesh in northern India. It comes under Bhadohi Lok Sabha constituency. Anegpur is a big carpet manufacturing village in Bhadohi. It is known for its hand-knotted carpet and Indo Gabbeh.

Geography 
This village is situated in the plains of the Ganges River.  Varuna and Morva are the main rivers.. The Village is bounded by river Morva in the west and the river Varuna in the North. Varuna separates Anegpur from Jaunpur district. The village is surrounded by Jaunpur district to the north. There are some small temples in Anegpur that are Shiv temple, Chaura mata mandir and Brahm Baba.

Overview 
Anegpur belongs to Mirzapur Division. The distance from Anegpur to Bhadohi block is approximately 8 km and, 20 km towards from District headquarters Gyanpur and 267 km from State capital Lucknow. Anegpur is approximately 40 km from Varanasi. Nearest railway station is Parsipur 3 km and Nearest market is Chauri Bazar about 1.5 km away. Chauri Bazar is very big and most famous market.

Agriculture 
The soil is mostly alluvial. The irrigation in the district takes place through Tubwells, Pumping Sets, River system. There are two Tubwells in Anegpur village. About 70% of the village area is under cultivation. The economy of the village mainly depends on agriculture and carpet manufacturing.

Schools 
Primary School (P S Anegpur) and Upper Primary School (U P S Anegpur) are two school in Anegpur. These schools are managed by Bedmanpur named as its cluster and managed by the Department of Education management. These schools are identified by the government of India Education Department by its code- for primary school and for upper primary school is 9,710,107,501 and 9,710,107,502 respectively. Primary school was recognised as a recognised school by the department of Uttar Pradesh education department in the year 1959, and upper primary school recognised in 2009. In primary school the lowest class is 1 and the highest class is 5. In Upper primary school the lowest class is 6 and the highest class is 8. Both schools teaches in languages as medium of instruction.

Regarding the faculty of the primary school there are 3 male teachers and 2 female teachers available for teaching the students. 4 teachers have professional qualifications and teachers are graduate and above. In upper primary school there are 3 male teachers available for teaching the students. 2 teachers have professional qualifications and teachers are graduate and above.

References

Villages in Bhadohi district